The 53rd Guldbagge Awards ceremony, presented by the Swedish Film Institute, honoring the best Swedish films of 2017 and took place on January 22, 2018 at Cirkus in Stockholm. The ceremony was televised by SVT, and comedian Petra Mede hosted the ceremony for the sixth time. She previously hosted the 46th, 47th, 50th, 51st, and 52nd ceremonies. The nominees were presented on January 4, 2018.

This year, the category Cinema Audience Award has been retired, and replaced by the Audience Award, presented by the Film Institute in collaboration with the newspaper Aftonbladet, which houses the vote.

Winners and nominees 
The nominees for the 53rd Guldbagge Awards were announced on 4 January 2018 in Stockholm, by the Swedish Film Institute.

Awards 

Winners are listed first and highlighted in '''boldface.

Films with multiple nominations and awards

See also 
 90th Academy Awards
 75th Golden Globe Awards
 71st British Academy Film Awards
 24th Screen Actors Guild Awards
 23rd Critics' Choice Awards
 22nd Satellite Awards
 38th Golden Raspberry Awards

References

External links 
 
Guldbaggen on Facebook
Guldbaggen on Twitter
53rd Guldbagge Awards at Internet Movie Database

2018 in Swedish cinema
2017 film awards
Guldbagge Awards ceremonies
2010s in Stockholm
January 2018 events in Sweden